Tammany, or Mount Tammany, is a historic home located at Williamsport, Washington County, Maryland, United States. It is a two-part brick structure resting on low fieldstone foundations. The main block is a two-story, three-bay structure with a side hall entrance. Attached to its north gable wall is a two-story five-bay structure also of brick.  The house features a one-story porch with a low-hipped roof, supported by round Doric columns.  It is believed to have been built in the 1780s by Matthew Van Lear, a prominent early resident of Washington County.

It was listed on the National Register of Historic Places in 1979.

References

External links
, including undated photo, at Maryland Historical Trust

Houses on the National Register of Historic Places in Maryland
Houses in Washington County, Maryland
National Register of Historic Places in Washington County, Maryland